The Southampton Evening Cricket League, formed in 1931, is one of the oldest cricket leagues in the United Kingdom. The current format of the league consists of four divisions of six to eight teams, playing each other once at home and once away. Matches are scheduled to start at 6.30 pm, and are limited to sixteen overs per side, with no bowler permitted to bowl more than four overs. The evening format means that matches may be played during the week after work; many teams represent workplaces in and around the city of Southampton. Matches were played in a timed format until 1949. An indoor league also runs during the winter months, although not all teams play in both versions of the league. As of 30 May 2012, matches have been temporarily moved away from the league's most famous venue - Hoglands Park.

Famous players

Several notable Test and county cricketers have played in the league, including Robin Smith, Kevin Shine, Gary Brent and Adrian Aymes.

Other famous players in the league include footballers Kevin Keegan, Ted Drake, Ted Bates & Jason Dodd.

External links
 Official website

1931 establishments in England
English domestic cricket competitions